Interstate 80 (I-80) is a part of the Interstate Highway System that runs from San Francisco, California, to Teaneck, New Jersey. In Wyoming, the Interstate Highway runs  from the Utah state line near Evanston east to the Nebraska state line in Pine Bluffs. I-80 connects Cheyenne, Wyoming's capital and largest city, with several smaller cities along the southern tier of Wyoming, including Evanston, Green River, Rock Springs, Rawlins, and Laramie. The highway also connects those cities with Salt Lake City to the west and Omaha to the east. In Cheyenne, I-80 intersects I-25 and has Wyoming's only auxiliary Interstate, I-180. The Interstate runs concurrently with US Highway 30 (US 30) for most of their courses in Wyoming. I-80 also has shorter concurrencies with US 189 near Evanston, US 191 near Rock Springs, and US 287 and Wyoming Highway 789 (WYO 789) near Rawlins. The Interstate has business loops through all six cities along its course as well as a loop serving Fort Bridger and Lyman east of Evanston.

Route description

Evanston to Rock Springs
I-80 enters Uinta County concurrent with US 189 from Summit County, Utah, west of Evanston, the county seat of Uinta County. The Interstate parallels the Union Pacific Railroad's Evanston Subdivision rail line to Yellow Creek, east of which the railroad parallels the creek northeast, and the highway heads east into the city of Evanston. I-80 Business (I-80 Bus.) and US 189 Bus. split northeast onto Harrison Drive. I-80 has an interchange with WYO 150 (Front Street) just south of downtown Evanston and cross over the railroad line and the Bear River shortly before the business routes (which use Bear River Drive) rejoin the Interstate on the eastern edge of the city. I-80 and US 189 continue east through interchanges with Painter Road and Divide Road before the US Highway splits northeast toward Kemmerer.

I-80 continues east through interchanges with Coal and Bar Hat roads and crosses over the Union Pacific Railroad rail line just west of the Leroy Road interchange. The highway has more minor junctions with French, Bigelow, and Union roads before I-80 Bus. splits southeast toward Fort Bridger; along this route there is a section of the I-80 that is known as the "Highway to Heaven" because of an optical illusion that makes it seem that the road is reaching toward the sky. I-80 parallels Blacks Fork of the Green River through interchanges with WYO 412 and WYO 414 north of Mountain View and WYO 413 north of Lyman before crossing over the river. The Interstate crosses over Smiths Fork, a tributary of Blacks Fork, before I-80 Bus. rejoins the mainline. I-80 has a junction with Church Butte Road before entering Sweetwater County. The highway meets the western end of WYO 374 south of Granger and has a trumpet interchange with US 30, which joins the Interstate in the first of several concurrencies east to Nebraska. A second segment of WYO 374 begins at the first interchange east of US 30 that serves Little America.

I-80 and US 30 parallel WYO 374 through a junction with Westvaco Road, across Blacks Fork again, and across the railroad before an interchange with WYO 374 and WYO 372. The Interstate has an interchange with Covered Wagon Road just west of its crossing of the Green River at James Town. I-80 and US 30 parallel the river and WYO 374 to the city of Green River, the county seat of Sweetwater County. The highway has trumpet interchanges with I-80 Bus. and US 30 Bus. on either side of the city; between the interchanges, the Interstate passes through the dual Green River Tunnel. The business route connects I-80 with WYO 530 (Uinta Drive). East of town, the highways follow Bitter Creek along the southern flank of White Mountain. US 191 joins I-80 and US 30 at Purple Sage; the three highways continue into the city of Rock Springs. I-80 Bus. and US 30 Bus. split east onto Dewar Drive. The mainline Interstate has partial cloverleaf interchanges with College Drive, which serves Western Wyoming Community College, and Elk Street, which US 191 joins to head north. The business routes, here named Pilot Butte Avenue, rejoin I-80 and US 30 on the east side of the city.

Rock Springs to Laramie
I-80 and US 30 continue east from Rock Springs parallel to the Union Pacific Railroad's Rawlins Subdivision and Bitter Creek. The Interstate has interchanges with WYO 370, which leads south to Southwest Wyoming Regional Airport; WYO 371, which heads north toward Superior; and WYO 372 at Point of Rocks. At Point of Rocks, I-80 and US 30 veer away from the railroad and Bitter Creek and cross the Red Desert. Within the desert, the Interstate has interchanges with a string of minor roads: Black Butte Road, Red Hill Road, Bitter Creek Road, Patrick Draw Road, Table Rock Road, Bar X Road, BLM Road, GL Road, Tipton Road, an exit simply labelled Red Desert, and Rasmussen Road. The only place of significance within this stretch is Table Rock, where the highway rejoins the railroad and enters the Great Divide Basin, an endorheic basin between two branches of the Continental Divide. I-80 and US 30 pass by the only town in the basin, Wamsutter, which is accessed by an interchange with Kelly Street. The freeway has a junction with Continental Divide Road and an interchange with WYO 789, which joins the Interstate eastbound.

I-80, US 30, and WYO 789 intersect Riner Road before entering Carbon County. The freeway continues through minor interchanges with Daley, Knobs, Hadsell, and Johnson roads; the freeway leaves the Great Divide Basin and enters the Mississippi River watershed west of Hadsell Road. WYO 789, I-80 Bus., and US 30 Bus. split from I-80 and US 30 at the west end of the city of Rawlins, the county seat of Carbon County. The Interstate crosses over the Rawlins Subdivision rail line and has an interchange with WYO 71 (Higley Boulevard). I-80 and US 30 cross back to the north side of the railroad and have a trumpet interchange with the two business routes and US 287, which joins the freeway heading east from Rawlins; WYO 76 splits east from the eastbound loop of the interchange. The Interstate has a trumpet interchange with Lincoln Avenue at the west end of Sinclair, then crosses over the railroad and WYO 76. I-80 and the two US Highways meet the eastern end of WYO 76 east of Sinclair. The three highways cross the North Platte River just east of the Fort Steele interchange.

US 30 and US 287 diverge from I-80 southwest of Hanna; WYO 130 heads south from the same interchange. I-80 continue east along the northern edge of the Medicine Bow Mountains and has junctions with Peterson Road and WYO 72, then crosses the Medicine Bow River. The Interstate continues through interchanges with Elk Mountain Medicine Bow Road, Wagonhound Road, and WYO 13 at Arlington, where the freeway crosses Rock Creek. I-80 intersects Cooper Cove Road before entering Albany County. The Interstate has interchanges with Quealy Dome Road and WYO 12 (Herrick Lane) around its crossing of the Little Laramie River. I-80 passes along the southern edge of Bamforth National Wildlife Refuge before entering Laramie, the county seat of Albany County. The freeway enters the city from the north, and I-80 Bus. splits east along Curtis Street. I-80 has interchanges with WYO 130 and WYO 230 (Snowy Range Road) and with US 287 (3rd Street) and crossings of the Laramie River and the Union Pacific Railroad's Laramie Subdivision as it curves east. The Interstate receives its business route and US 30 at a trumpet interchange on the eastern edge of the city.

A book, Snow Chi Minh Trail: The History of Interstate 80 between Laramie and Walcott Junction, was published by the Wyoming State Historical Society in 2017 describing the dangerous history of winter travel on the  stretch of I-80 between exit 235 (near Rawlins and Hanna) and Laramie. Due to the numerous winter closures along this stretch, the Wyoming Department of Transportation (WYDOT) has proposed rerouting the highway to the north along US 30.

Laramie to Pine Bluffs
East of Laramie, I-80 and US 30 head southeast and cross the Laramie Mountains. The two highways reach their national high point at Sherman Summit, where they have an interchange with WYO 210 (Happy Jack Road). I-80 and US 30 have interchanges with Vedauwoo and Buford roads, the latter at the settlement of Buford just before the freeway enters Laramie County. The Interstate and US Highways rejoin the railroad and pass through minor junctions with Remount, Harriman, and Warren roads. I-80 and US 30 meet the western end of WYO 225 (Otto Road), which they parallel east to Cheyenne. The two highways have an interchange with WYO 222 (Roundtop Road) just west of a three-ramp partial cloverleaf interchange with the eastern end of WYO 225 (Otto Road) and the western end of I-80 Bus. (Lincolnway), onto which US 30 exits. The missing movement from the surface highway to eastbound I-80 is made via the business route's nearby interchange with I-25 and US 87.

I-80 continues east across the Union Pacific Railroad to a full cloverleaf interchange with I-25 and US 87, where the highway enters the city of Cheyenne, the county seat and state capital. The Interstate crosses over a BNSF Railway line and has a diamond interchange with US 85 and the southern end of I-180, a non-freeway spur into downtown Cheyenne. East of I-180, I-80 receives the eastern end of its business route at its junction with WYO 212 (College Drive). East of its interchange with Campstool Road, the freeway leaves the city of Cheyenne and collects the eastern end of US 30 (Archer Boulevard). I-80 and US 30 have interchanges serving Hillsdale and Egbert around a junction with WYO 213 and WYO 214, which serve Burns and Carpenter, respectively. I-80 and US 30 reapproach the Union Pacific Railroad's Sidney Subdivision east of Burns and parallel it to Pine Bluffs, the easternmost town in Wyoming. There, US 30 splits north and immediately meets the southern terminus of WYO 215. At the eastern town limit of Pine Bluffs, I-80 enters Kimball County, Nebraska.

History

Exit list

Related routes
 
I-80 has eight Interstate business routes in Wyoming. In addition, there is also one auxiliary Interstate in the state, I-180 in Cheyenne.

References

External links

80
 Wyoming
Transportation in Uinta County, Wyoming
Transportation in Sweetwater County, Wyoming
Transportation in Carbon County, Wyoming
Transportation in Albany County, Wyoming
Transportation in Laramie County, Wyoming
Transportation in Cheyenne, Wyoming